Arwyn may refer to:

Arwyn Davies (born 1967), Welsh actor
Arwyn Davies, Baron Arwyn (1897-1978), Welsh life peer
Arwyn Jones (born 1971), English cricketer
Arwyn Lynn Ungoed-Thomas (1904-1972), Welsh Labour Party politician and British judge
Arwyn, protagonist of Sojourn

See also
Arwen (disambiguation)

Welsh masculine given names
Unisex given names